South Korean girl group WJSN, also known as Cosmic Girls, have released one studio album, ten extended plays, one single album, thirteen digital singles and they have also participated in five collaboration songs.

Studio albums

Extended plays

Single albums

Singles

Promotional singles

Collaborations

Videography

Music videos

Notes

References

Cosmic Girls
Discographies of South Korean artists
K-pop music group discographies